The title Earl Castleton, of Sandbeck in the County of York, was created in the Peerage of Great Britain in 1720 for the 6th Viscount Castleton, who had previously been created Baron Saunderson, of Saxby in the County of Lincoln, in 1714, and Viscount Castleton, of Sandbeck in the County of York, in 1716, both also in the Peerage of Great Britain.

The title Viscount Castleton had been created in the Peerage of Ireland in 1627, along with the subsidiary title Baron Saunderson, of Bantry in the County of Cork, for Sir Nicholas Saunderson, 1st Baronet, who had been created a Baronet, styled "of Saxby in the County of Lincoln", in the Baronetage of England, in 1611.

All of the titles became extinct on the death of the 1st Earl in 1723.  His estates passed to his cousin Lieutenant-Colonel Thomas Lumley, who thereupon took the additional surname of Saunderson by Act of Parliament and subsequently succeeded as 3rd Earl of Scarbrough.

Saunderson Baronets (1611)
Sir Nicholas Saunderson, 1st Baronet (1561–1630) (created Viscount Castleton in 1627)

Viscounts Castleton (1627)
Nicholas Saunderson, 1st Viscount Castleton (1561–1630)
Nicholas Saunderson, 2nd Viscount Castleton (d. 1640)
Nicholas Saunderson, 3rd Viscount Castleton (1625–1641)
Peregrine Saunderson, 4th Viscount Castleton (1628–1650)
George Saunderson, 5th Viscount Castleton (1631–1714)
James Saunderson, 6th Viscount Castleton (1667–1723) (created Earl Castleton in 1720)

Earls Castleton (1720)
James Saunderson, 1st Earl Castleton (1667–1723)

References

 

Extinct earldoms in the Peerage of Great Britain
Noble titles created in 1720
1720 establishments in Great Britain